The Four Loves is a 1960 book by C. S. Lewis which explores the nature of love from a Christian and philosophical perspective through thought experiments. The book was based on a set of radio talks from 1958 which had been criticised in the U.S. at the time for their frankness about sex.

Need/gift love 
Taking his start from St. John's words "God is Love", Lewis initially thought to contrast "Need-love" (such as the love of a child for its mother) and "Gift-love" (epitomized by God's love for humanity), to the disparagement of the former. However, he swiftly happened on the insight that the natures of even these basic categorizations of love are more complicated than they at first seemed: a child's need for parental comfort is a necessity, not a selfish indulgence, while conversely parental Gift-love in excessive form can be a perversion of its own.

Pleasures 
Lewis continues his examination by exploring the nature of pleasure, distinguishing Need-pleasures (such as water for the thirsty) from Pleasures of Appreciation, such as the love of nature. From the latter, he developed what he called "a third element in love ... Appreciative love", to go along with Need-love and Gift-love.

Throughout the rest of the book, Lewis goes on to counterpoint that three-fold, qualitative distinction against the four broad types of loves indicated in his title.

In his remaining four chapters, Lewis treats love under four categories ("the highest does not stand without the lowest"), based in part on the four Greek words for love: affection, friendship, eros, and charity. Lewis states that just as Lucifer (a former archangel) perverted himself by pride and fell into depravity, so too can love – commonly held to be the arch-emotion – become corrupt by presuming itself to be what it is not.

A fictional treatment of these loves is the main theme of Lewis's novel Till We Have Faces.

The four loves

Storge – empathy bond 
Storge (storgē, Greek: στοργή) is liking someone through the fondness of familiarity, family members or people who relate in familiar ways that have otherwise found themselves bonded by chance. An example is the natural love and affection of a parent for their child. It is described as the most natural, emotive, and widely diffused of loves: It is natural in that it is present without coercion, emotive because it is the result of fondness due to familiarity, and most widely diffused because it pays the least attention to those characteristics deemed "valuable" or worthy of love and, as a result, is able to transcend most discriminating factors. Lewis describes it as a dependency-based love which risks extinction if the needs cease to be met.

Affection, for Lewis, included both Need-love and Gift-love. He considered it responsible for nine-tenths of all solid and lasting human happiness.

However, affection's strength is also what makes it vulnerable.  Affection has the appearance of being "built-in" or "ready made", says Lewis, and as a result, people come to expect it irrespective of their behaviour and its natural consequences. Both in its Need and its Gift form, affection then is liable to "go bad", and to be corrupted by such forces as jealousy, ambivalence and smothering.

Philia – friend bond 
Philia (Greek: φιλία) is the love between friends as close as siblings in strength and duration. The friendship is the strong bond existing between people who share common values, interests or activities. Lewis immediately differentiates friendship love from the other loves. He describes friendship as "the least biological, organic, instinctive, gregarious and necessary...the least natural of loves". Our species does not need friendship in order to reproduce, but to the classical and medieval worlds, it is a higher-level love because it is freely chosen.

Lewis explains that true friendships, like the friendship between David and Jonathan in the Bible, are almost a lost art. He expresses a strong distaste for the way modern society ignores friendship. He notes that he cannot remember any poem that celebrated true friendship like that between David and Jonathan, Orestes and Pylades, Roland and Oliver, Amis and Amiles. Lewis goes on to say, "to the Ancients, Friendship seemed the happiest and most fully human of all loves; the crown of life and the school of virtue. The modern world, in comparison, ignores it".

Growing out of companionship, friendship for Lewis was a deeply appreciative love, though one which he felt few people in modern society could value at its worth, because so few actually experienced true friendship.

Nevertheless, Lewis was not blind to what he considered the dangers of friendships, such as its potential for cliquiness, anti-authoritarianism and pride.

Eros – romantic love 
Eros (erōs, Greek: ἔρως) for Lewis was love in the sense of "being in love" or "loving" someone, as opposed to the raw sexuality of what he called Venus: the illustration Lewis used was the distinction between "wanting a woman" and wanting one particular woman – something that matched his (classical) view of man as a rational animal, a composite both of reasoning angel and instinctual alley-cat.

Eros turns the need-pleasure of Venus into the most appreciative of all pleasures; but nevertheless, Lewis warned against the modern tendency for Eros to become a god to people who fully submit themselves to it, a justification for selfishness, even a phallic religion.

After exploring sexual activity and its spiritual significance in both a pagan and a Christian sense, he notes how Eros (or being in love) is in itself an indifferent, neutral force: how "Eros in all his splendour ... may urge to evil as well as good".
While accepting that Eros can be an extremely profound experience, he does not overlook the dark way in which it could lead even to the point of suicide pacts or murder, as well as to furious refusals to part, "mercilessly chaining together two mutual tormentors, each raw all over with the poison of hate-in-love".

Agape – unconditional "God" love 
Charity (agápē, Greek: ἀγάπη) is the love that exists regardless of changing circumstances. Lewis recognizes this selfless love as the greatest of the four loves, and sees it as a specifically Christian virtue to achieve. The chapter on the subject focuses on the need to subordinate the other three natural loves – as Lewis puts it, "The natural loves are not self-sufficient" – to the love of God, who is full of charitable love, to prevent what he termed their "demonic" self-aggrandizement.

See also 

 Attachment theory
 Friendship
 Heterosociality
 Homosociality
 Inklings
 Love styles
 Romance
 Platonic love
 Triangular theory of love
 Unconditional love

References

External links
 
 

1960 non-fiction books
Books by C. S. Lewis
Irish non-fiction books
Philosophy of love
Thought experiments in philosophy
Geoffrey Bles books